Alex Fabbri (born 18 August 1998) is a Sammarinese motorcycle racer.

Career statistics

Grand Prix motorcycle racing

By season

 * Season still in progress.

Races by year

 * Season still in progress.

External links

Profile on CIV.tv

Living people
Sammarinese motorcycle racers
Moto3 World Championship riders
1998 births